Peckham is an unincorporated community in Kay County, Oklahoma, United States. It was named for railroad developer Ed L. Peckham. A post office opened in Peckham on July 15, 1899.

Demographics

References

Unincorporated communities in Kay County, Oklahoma
Unincorporated communities in Oklahoma